AM-630 (6-Iodopravadoline) is a drug that acts as a potent and selective inverse agonist for the cannabinoid receptor CB2, with a Ki of 32.1 nM at CB2 and 165x selectivity over CB1, at which it acted as a weak partial agonist. It is used in the study of CB2 mediated responses and has been used to investigate the possible role of CB2 receptors in the brain. AM-630 is significant as one of the first indole derived cannabinoid ligands substituted on the 6-position of the indole ring, a position that has subsequently been found to be important in determining affinity and efficacy at both the CB1 and CB2 receptors, and has led to the development of many related derivatives.

See also
 AM-1221
 Pravadoline
 WIN 54,461 (6-Bromopravadoline)

References

Benzoylindoles
AM cannabinoids
4-Morpholinyl compunds
Aminoalkylindoles
Iodoarenes
Designer drugs